Gujarat Legislative Assembly or Gujarat Vidhan Sabha is the unicameral legislature of the Indian state of Gujarat, in the state capital Gandhinagar. Presently, 182 members of the Legislative Assembly are directly elected from single-member constituencies (seats). It has a term of 5 years unless it is dissolved sooner. 13 constituencies are reserved for scheduled castes and 27 constituencies for scheduled tribes.  From its majority party group or by way of a grand coalition cabinet of its prominent members,the state's Executive namely the Government of Gujarat is formed. 

Since 1995, the Gujarat Legislative Assembly is controlled by the Bharatiya Janata Party with a majority after elections.

History
Bhavsinhji Gohil, ruler of Bhavnagar State, established The Peoples' Representative Assembly consisting of 38 members appointed by him. His succeeding son, Krishnakumar Sinhji, formed the Bhavnagar legislative assembly in 1941 having 55 members, consisting of 33 elected members, 16 nominated members by him and 6 ex-officio members. They had power to ask questions, move resolutions, discuss the budget and introduce bills in the assembly. This assembly used to meet at least twice in a year. Porbandar state assembly had same powers. Sayajirao Gaekwad III, ruler of Baroda State, had formed the Baroda legislative assembly in 1908.

Since 1921, representatives were elected by the people of that area of the present Gujarat state except the princely states, and sent to the Bombay State legislative assembly. In 1952, Saurashtra State legislative assembly was constituted after the independence of India. It was functional till 31 October 1956. Saurashtra State was merged into the Bombay State under the States Reorganization Act, 1956.

On 1 May 1960, the Bombay State was bifurcated into Gujarat and Maharashtra states which resulted in formation of Gujarat legislative assembly. The 132 members of the former Bombay legislative assembly, elected from the territorial constituencies of Gujarat, formed the first Gujarat legislative assembly. The number of the members was increased to 154 in 1962, 168 in 1967 and 182 in 1975.

Location
After formation of Gujarat state in 1960, Ahmedabad was a capital of the state. The Assembly started functioning from the present day OPD building of Ahmedabad Civil Hospital. The new capital city, Gandhinagar was built in 1971. Later assembly was shifted to Central Library building, sector-17, Gandhinagar on 11 February 1971. The new assembly building, Vithalbhai Patel Bhavan, was completed and inaugurated in 1982. Since then the Gujarat legislative assembly functions there.

Building
President Neelam Sanjiva Reddy laid foundation stone of new assembly building, Vithalbhai Patel Bhavan on 20 March 1978. It was designed by H. K. Mewada, chief planner of Gandhinagar. The construction was completed in July 1982 and it is named after Vithalbhai Patel, the first Indian speaker of Central Legislative Assembly during the British period. It was inaugurated by the Governor Sharda Mukherjee on 8 July 1982.

It is constructed with Reinforced concrete and the outer walls of the building is affixed with Dholpur light pink stones. The building is constructed on the 133 square metre platform amid a water pool having diameter of 200 metres. This central building was linked with the Ministerial Secretariat by bridges formerly but now new buildings are constructed in between known as Swarnim Sankul. The building is 33.45 metres high including its octagonal dome. The constructed area of building is 8100 square metres while the total built up area of square platform is 17689 square metres. It has four floors with total built up area of 43350 square metres or total carpet area of 16180 square metres. The entrance of the building is reached by a flight of steps.

The Assembly hall is situated on the second floor. It is octagonal from inside. The octagonal roof is supported by eight V-shaped pillars and one pillar in the centre. These pillars tapers and forms octagonal dome on the hall. There is an arrangement of white floodlights on the top. The hall has a capacity of 232 seats though currently the assembly has only 182 elected members. The hall is viewed from the galleries on the third floor which has a capacity of 564 seats.

There is a podium just under the Assembly hall which is used for ceremonies and functions. The downward floor of the Assembly hall makes an umbrella-like roof of the podium. The podium has some personal belongings of Mahatma Gandhi and Vallabhbhai Patel on display. There are oil paintings of several national leaders, independence activists and personalities on its walls.

It was constructed at the cost of  6 crore. The assembly building along with other government offices is in Sector 10 of Gandhinagar, a capitol complex spanning 370 acres.

List of speakers

Structure

At present, 13 constituencies are reserved for candidates of the Scheduled Castes, and 27 constituencies are reserved for candidates of the Scheduled tribes.

Members of Legislative Assembly

See also
 Elections in Gujarat
 Politics of Gujarat
 Council of Ministers of Gujarat
 List of constituencies of Gujarat Legislative Assembly
 15th Gujarat Assembly

External links 
 Gujarat Legislative Assembly on eVidhan
 Gujarat Election 2019 Results Website
 Official definitions of Gujarat Legislative Assembly constituencies

References
Gujarat Assembly Elections - Nav Bharat Times

 
Politics of Gujarat
State legislatures of India
Gujarat